Sady may refer to:


Places in Poland
Sady, Lower Silesian Voivodeship (south-west Poland)
Sady, Podlaskie Voivodeship (north-east Poland)
Sady, Łódź Voivodeship (central Poland)
Sady, Lublin Voivodeship (east Poland)
Sady, Płock County in Masovian Voivodeship (east-central Poland)
Sady, Przysucha County in Masovian Voivodeship (east-central Poland)
Sady, Nowy Dwór Mazowiecki County in Masovian Voivodeship (east-central Poland)
Sady, Poznań County in Greater Poland Voivodeship (west-central Poland)
Sady, Wągrowiec County in Greater Poland Voivodeship (west-central Poland)
Sady, Opole Voivodeship (south-west Poland)
Sady, Warmian-Masurian Voivodeship (north Poland)

Given name
 Sady Courville (1905–1988), American Cajun fiddler
 Jude Ellison Sady Doyle (born 1982), American feminist author
 Sady Rebbot (1935–1994), French actor
 Sady Salinas (born 1994), Paraguayan footballer
 Sady Zañartu (1893–1983), Chilean writer

See also 
Sady, Leningrad Oblast, a settlement in Leningrad Oblast, Russia
Sadie (disambiguation)